The Lasell Neighborhood Historic District is a historic district roughly bounded by Woodland and Studio Roads, Aspen and Seminary Avenue, and Grove Street in Newton, Massachusetts village of Auburndale, Massachusetts.  The area includes high-quality late-19th and early-20th century housing built in the area, and includes buildings on the campus of Lasell University, established as the Auburndale Female Seminary in 1851.  The district was listed on the National Register of Historic Places in 1986.

Description and history
Auburndale was a remote farming area into the early 19th century, its land first divided by European settlers in the 17th century.  Worcester Turnpike (Massachusetts Route 9) was built to its south in 1809.  The Boston and Worcester Railroad was built through the area in the 1840s, with a station in Auburndale opening in 1851, spurring development.  The area grew as a railroad commuter suburb in the second half of 19th century, and saw further development pressure in the 1890s when Commonwealth Avenue was extended to Newton's western edge.

The Lasell neighborhood is located south of the railroad right of way.   A number of high quality Second Empire and Italianate houses survive from its early period of development, notable among them 195 Woodland Road (1875), 222 Grove Street (c. 1875), and 176 Grove (c. 1862).  The latter is a particularly fine example of the more formal Second Empire, with an ornate entrance and a bellcast mansard roof broken by a mansarded gable.  One of the city's finest Ruskinian Gothic houses is the large Winslow-Haskell Mansion at 53 Vista Avenue (1870, now condominiums).  At 62 Vista Avenue is a fine example of Italianate architecture, built c. 1879.

Some of the district's buildings are part of the Lasell University campus, and there are a significant number of fine Colonial Revival houses in the district.

The historic district was created in response to the college's moves to expand and upgrade its presence. Even after the creation of the historic district, neighbors have objected to new buildings and facilities including a campus-based retirement community.

See also
 National Register of Historic Places listings in Newton, Massachusetts

References

External links
Lasell Neighborhood Association
Auburndale Historic District

National Register of Historic Places in Newton, Massachusetts
Historic districts in Middlesex County, Massachusetts
Second Empire architecture in Massachusetts
Queen Anne architecture in Massachusetts
Colonial Revival architecture in Massachusetts
Historic districts on the National Register of Historic Places in Massachusetts
Lasell College